Okhla Assembly constituency is one of the seventy Delhi assembly constituencies of Delhi in northern India.
Okhla assembly constituency is a part of East Delhi (Lok Sabha constituency). Okhla Assembly includes Madanpur Khadar Village, Khizrabad Village, Jasola Village, Aali Village and Taimoor Nagar.

Members of Legislative Assembly 

 ^ : By-election held due to election of Parvez Hashmi as Rajya Sabha MP

Election results

2020

2015

2013

2009 By Election results

2008

2003

1998

1993

References

Assembly constituencies of Delhi
Delhi Legislative Assembly